Sarum (also titled Sarum: The Novel of England) is a work of historical fiction by Edward Rutherfurd, first published in 1987. It is Rutherfurd's literary debut. It tells the story of England through the tales of several families in and around the English city of Salisbury, the writer's hometown, from prehistoric times to 1985.

Characters 
The main families of Sarum include:
 Forest
 Wilson
 Porters
 Mason
 Shockley
 Godfrey

Synopsis 
The story covers major points of British history. The following chapter listing parallels major periods and events :

Old Sarum 

 Journey to Sarum (prehistoric Britain, 7500BC)
 The Barrow (the arrival of agriculture in Britain, 4000BC)
 The Henge (the building of Stonehenge, 2000BC)
 Sorviodunum (the arrival of the Romans, 42AD)
 Twilight (the fall of the Roman Empire/arrival of the Saxons, 427AD)
 The Two Rivers (arrival of the Vikings/uniting of England, 877AD)
 The Castle (Norman England, 1139AD)

New Sarum 

 The Founding (the founding of New Sarum/building of Salisbury Cathedral, 1244-1310)
 The Death (the Black Death, 1348-1382)
 The Rose (the Rule of Lancaster, 1456)
 A Journey From Sarum (1480)
 New World (The Reformation, 1553-1580)
 The Unrest (The English Civil War/ the Exclusion Crisis, 1642-1688)
 The Calm (the eighteenth century, 1720-1779)
 Boney (the Battle of Trafalgar, 1803-1830)
 Empire (the British Empire, 1854-1889)
 The Henge II (World War I/the selling of Stonehenge, 1915)
 The Encampment (World War II, 1944)
 The Spire (Salisbury in 1985)

References 

1987 British novels
1987 debut novels
Cathedrals in fiction
Historical novels
Novels by Edward Rutherfurd
Novels set in prehistory
Novels set in Wiltshire
Hutchinson (publisher) books